Aontú ("Unite") is an all-Ireland political party that was formally launched in January 2019, and operates in both the Republic of Ireland and Northern Ireland. Ideologically, Aontú is opposed to abortion and combines elements of social conservatism with advocacy for a united Ireland and centre-left economics. It has been led by Peadar Tóibín since its foundation.

History
The party was founded by Peadar Tóibín, a TD who resigned from Sinn Féin on 15 November 2018 due to his anti-abortion views after opposing the party whip on the Health (Regulation of Termination of Pregnancy) Act 2018. He began canvassing elected representatives, securing support within a week from two local councillors in the Republic. Tóibín held meetings across the island addressing interested potential members. The first Northern Ireland local councillor declared on 7 January 2019.  eight councillors had joined. A second councillor in Northern Ireland joined on 26 February 2019.

The name Aontú was announced at a meeting in Belfast on 28 January 2019. The Meath Chronicle said that the announcement of the name was precipitated by its unexpected publication on the UK Electoral Commission website. Tóibín said the party had sought registration in both jurisdictions, that "Aontú obviously means unity and our major objective is the unity of Irish people north and south". He recalled that Belfast was the birthplace of the United Irishmen of 1798. Aontú would "seek to build an all-Ireland economy to mitigate the worst effects of Brexit, economic justice for all and to protect the right to life." Tóibín said he was talking with Sinn Féin, SDLP and independent representatives in Northern Ireland, and that "people from Sinn Féin, SDLP and Fianna Fáil backgrounds would feel comfortable" in the party.

Aontú's then deputy leader Anne McCloskey came under criticism for her comments about the effectiveness of masks during the COVID-19 pandemic, with party leader Peadar Tóibín defending her right to her view on the topic.  McCloskey stepped down as a councillor in October 2020, and was replaced by party member Emmet Doyle. She was replaced as deputy leader by Denise Mullen. At the 2022 Ard Fheis, Mullen stepped down from the position of deputy leader was and replaced by Gemma Brolly, Aontú candidate for East Derry at the May 2022 Assembly election.

In November 2020, the Standards in Public Office Commission announced that Aontú were one of five political parties who failed to provide them with a set of audited accounts for 2019, in breach of statutory obligations. In response, Aontú released a statement claiming that they had submitted the account statements and apologising for the delay, citing the COVID-19 pandemic.

Ideology

While Aontú was founded in a split from Sinn Féin, Aontú members and elected representatives come from diverse political backgrounds: two councillors are former members of the Social Democratic and Labour Party, one councillor is a former member of Fianna Fáil, and two other councillors never held political office prior to joining Aontú. The party retains the ideology of Irish republicanism and related policies; for example, Aontú maintains a policy of abstentionism, which means that while it runs candidates in Northern Ireland in British general elections, should an Aontú candidate be elected they would not take up their seat in the British parliament.

The party was described by the unionist Belfast News Letter as "Catholic conservative" and by The Times as "socially conservative", while Harry McGee described the party's ideology as "rural conservatism and traditionalism". It is anti-abortion. The party holds left-leaning views on economics and climate change. Tóibín advocates for "sustainable levels" and "managed" immigration into Ireland and has called for "a nuanced debate that lies neither in walls nor in open borders." In 2021 deputy leader Denise Mullen called for greater action during the Afghan refugee crisis and for Ireland to be "a leader in accepting Afghan refugees". The Irish Catholic editor Michael Kelly believed the party could "capitalise" on the "abandon[ment] [of] many of the values that were key to a largely Catholic electorate in the North" by "the traditional parties of nationalism".

As of early 2020, the party's published policies included proposals for a United Ireland; a referendum on a "right to collective bargaining and trade union membership"; an end to zero hours contracts; and increased state spending on public housing. Their site states Ireland should model itself on the "best practice in Scandinavian countries." In their 2021 budget submission, they called on changes to the state pension scheme, reducing Leap Card fares and increasing the Banking Levy.

Elections

2019 local elections
At the 2019 Northern Ireland local elections on 2 May, Aontú nominated 16 candidates across 7 of the 11 local councils. It won one seat, Anne McCloskey in Ballyarnett DEA on Derry and Strabane Council, with its two outgoing councillors losing their seats. Several months after the election, a councillor for the SDLP in Mid Ulster joined Aontú.

The party nominated 53 candidates for the Republic's local elections on 24 May, including its seven sitting councillors. Three were elected. It did not run any candidates in the elections for the European Parliament held in Northern Ireland or in the Republic.

2019 Dáil by-elections
Aontú contested two of the four 2019 Dáil by-elections. Finian Toomey came 7th in Cork North-Central with 1,008 votes (3.9%), being eliminated on the fifth count. Jim Codd came 6th in Wexford with 2,102 votes (5.2%), being eliminated on the second count.

2019 United Kingdom general election
Aontú contested 7 of the 18 Northern Ireland seats in the 2019 United Kingdom general election. The party received 9,814 votes (1.2%).

2020 Irish general election and Seanad election
Aontú fielded 25 candidates in the 2020 Irish general election, including leader Peadar Tóibín (Meath West), deputy leader Anne McCloskey (Sligo-Leitrim) and a number of sitting local councillors. Tóibín was the only successful candidate. As Tóibín was not invited to participate in a televised debate alongside the leaders of other parties, the party threatened a High Court action against RTÉ. The party, however, did not proceed with the action noting that there "was not enough time to have the action heard" before the debate.

In the 2020 Seanad election, Paul Lawless contested the Cultural and Educational Panel receiving 2.6% of votes.

2021 Dublin Bay South Dáil by-election
Mairéad Tóibín unsuccessfully contested the 2021 Dublin Bay South by-election, coming 9th with 740 first preference votes (2.9%) on the first count, being eliminated on the fifth count.

2022 Northern Ireland Assembly election
Aontú fielded 12 candidates in the 2022 Northern Ireland Assembly election. None of Aontú's candidates were elected, with the party coming in 8th place with 12,777 first preference votes (1.5%).

Representatives
The party has one representative, TD Peadar Tóibín, at national level (in Dáil Éireann). As of early 2020, Aontú had five sitting representatives at local level, including three county councillors in the Republic of Ireland and two local councillors in Northern Ireland.

Election results

Dáil Éireann

Northern Ireland Assembly

Westminster elections

Local elections

Ógra Aontú
Aontú's youth branch, Ógra Aontú, was formed in May 2020. Membership of the branch is open to Aontú members aged between 16 and 30.

Footnotes

References

External links

2019 establishments in Ireland
All-Ireland political parties
Anti-abortion organisations in the Republic of Ireland
Anti-abortion organisations in the United Kingdom
 
Conservative parties in Ireland
Conservative parties in the United Kingdom
Eurosceptic parties in Ireland
Irish republican parties
Political parties established in 2019
Political parties in Northern Ireland
Political parties in the Republic of Ireland
Sinn Féin breakaway groups
Syncretic political movements